Holy Moses is a German thrash metal band from Aachen. Formed in October 1980, the group was originally a trio consisting of guitarist and vocalist Jochen Fünders, bassist Ramon Brüssler, and drummer Peter Vonderstein. After a string of early lineup changes, the band settled on its first consistent lineup in December 1981 with the addition of vocalist Sabina Hirtz (later Classen), alongside guitarist Andy Classen, Brüssler and drummer Paul Linzenich. The current lineup of Holy Moses includes Sabina Classen, bassist Thomas Neitsch (since 2008), drummer Gerd Lücking (since 2011) and guitarist Peter Geltat (since 2012).

History

1980–1986 
Holy Moses was formed on 17 October 1980 by Jochen Fünders, Ramon Brüssler and Peter Vonderstein. The original trio debuted with the demo Black Metal Masters before the end of the year. Shortly after a show on 17 October 1981 to mark the band's first anniversary, Fünders was replaced by vocalist Wolfgang "Iggy" Dammers and guitarist Andy Classen (after a brief tenure for a Belgian guitarist called Jean-Claude), while Vonderstein also made way for Paul Linzenich. The new lineup released a self-titled second demo, before Dammers was replaced by Classen's girlfriend Sabina Hirtz on 3 December 1981. Three more demos followed (Satan's Angel, Call of the Demon and Heavy Metal), and Hirtz and Classen married in late 1983, before Linzenich left at the beginning of 1984 to return to university. When Sabina also briefly left, she introduced the band to her brother Tom and his drummer bandmate, who took over from the departed members for "about four weeks" before Brüssler asked Hirtz to leave due to stylistic differences.

When Sabina initially declined a return to Holy Moses, the band briefly worked with another female singer (known by Sabina's recollection as "Katrin or Katja"), before Sabina returned and the band brought in new drummer Jörg "Snake" Heins. The new lineup recorded demos Death Bells and Walpurgisnight, before Heins was forced by his parents to leave the group to focus on his university studies. He was replaced in November 1985 by Herbert Dreger, who debuted on The Bitch demo recorded at the end of the year. The band signed with producer Ralph Hubert's AAARRGG Records in February 1986 and subsequently recorded their debut full-length album Queen of Siam, which was released that spring. Shortly after the album was recorded, Dreger was fired after attending a Whitesnake show on the same night as a planned support slot for Agent Steel.

1986–1994 
Dreger was replaced in July 1986 by 19-year-old Uli Kusch. In September, founding bassist and band manager Ramon Büssler left the band, with Andre Chapelier taking his place by November. The new lineup released Finished with the Dogs in July 1987, at which pointed Georgie Symbos was brought in as a temporary second guitarist. By September, just before a European tour, Holy Moses had lost Chapelier after a dispute between him and producer Ralph Hubert, replaced by Johan Susant for the rest of the year.

After the 1987 run of shows was over, touring members Symbos and Susant left Holy Moses. The band returned early the next year with new members Thilo Hermann on guitar and Thomas Becker on bass, who performed on the band's next album The New Machine of Liechtenstein. After the album's recording, however, Hermann decided to return to his previous band; the group began rehearsing with cover art designer Rainer Laws, who became an official member early the following year. By January 1990, however, Laws had decided to leave on the eve of a tour to focus on his design work, after initially being unavailable due to illness. The group remained a four-piece.

In May 1990 the band released World Chaos, which marked the last contributions of Becker and Kusch. They were replaced for tour dates starting in June by Benny "Speed" Schnell and Guido "Atomic Steif" Richter, respectively. Terminal Terror followed in 1991, before Sven "Meff" Herwig replaced Steif in 1992 for the recording of Reborn Dogs. For 1994's No Matter What's the Cause, former Anthrax bassist Dan Lilker replaced Schnell. Shortly after the album's release, Holy Moses disbanded.

Since 2000 
After a six-year absence, Holy Moses was reformed in late 2000 by Sabina Classen without Andy. With guitarists Jörn Schubert and Franky Brotz, drummer Julien Schmidt, and founding member Jochen Fünders on bass, the band released the EP Master of Disaster in 2001, before Fünders left due to family commitments and was replaced by Andreas Libera. The band's eighth full-length album Disorder of the Order followed in 2002, before Schubert was replaced by Michael Hankel in the summer. By mid-2003, Libera had been replaced by Alex De Blanco. The new lineup released Strength Power Will Passion in 2005, before De Blanco and Schmidt were replaced that summer by Robert "Ozzy" Freese and Asgard Niels, respectively. Hankel also became the band's sole guitarist at the same time.

In July 2006, Freese was forced to step back from Holy Moses due to being "reportedly very ill". The next month, the band announced that he would return after a stay in a psychiatric hospital, during which time their live performances would feature programmed bass, as several potential replacements were unable to take over. Later in the year, Oliver Jaath took over from Freese. Before the end of 2006, Niels decided to leave Holy Moses due to "personal differences as well as totally different perspectives in musical progress". He was replaced in February 2007 by returning drummer Atomic Steif. The new lineup began working on material for Agony of Death, which was completed with new bassist Thomas Neitsch who was officially added in May 2008, with Jaath switching to guitar. Steif remained until July 2011, when he was replaced by Gerd Lücking.

After the completion of their 11th studio album 30th Anniversary: In the Power of Now, Hankel left Holy Moses in March 2012 due to "personal reasons" and was replaced by Peter Geltat, who had featured on the recording. Geltat became the band's only guitarist the following autumn, when Jaath departed before the recording of Redefined Mayhem.

Members

Current

Former

Timeline

Lineups

References

External links 

Holy Moses on Facebook

Holy Moses